Abelian varieties are a natural generalization of elliptic curves, including algebraic tori in higher dimensions.

Constructions over characteristic 0

Principally polarized Abelian varieties 
Notice if  this gives  matrices with positive imaginary part, hence this set is a generalization of the upper half plane. Then any point  gives a complex torus with a principal polarization  from the matrix page 34. It turns out all principally polarized Abelian varieties arise this way, giving  the structure of a parameter space for all principally polarized Abelian varieties. If this is instead given by a GIT quotient, then it gives the coarse moduli space .

Principally polarized Abelian varieties with level n-structure 
In many cases, it is easier to work with the moduli space of principally polarized Abelian varieties with level n-structure because it creates a rigidification of the moduli problem which gives a moduli functor instead of a moduli stack. This means the functor is representable by an algebraic manifold, such as a variety or scheme, instead of a stack. A level n-structure is given by a fixed basis of

 

where  is the lattice . Fixing such a basis removes the automorphisms of an abelian variety at a point in the moduli space, hence there exists a bona-fide algebraic manifold without a stabilizer structure. Denoteand defineas a quotient variety.

References

See also 

Schottky problem
Siegel modular variety
Moduli stack of elliptic curves
Moduli of algebraic curves
 Hilbert scheme
 Deformation Theory

Abelian varieties
Elliptic curves